The Vlčí hora (German: Wolfsberg, 581 m) is one of the most prominent peaks in the lowlands of the Šluknov Hook (Šluknovsko) in the Czech Republic.

Location and area 
The Vlčí hora is located in the Šluknov Hook, six kilometres west of Rumburk immediately on the edge of the forest and rock landscape of the Bohemian Switzerland. At its foot are the municipalities of Staré Křečany (Alt Ehrenberg) with the village of Brtníky (Zeidler), and Krásná Lípa (Schönlinde) with its villages of Sněžná (Schnauhübel), Vlčí Hora (Wolfsberg) and Zahrady (Gärten). The summit is crowned by an old mountain hut with an observation tower. At the eastern foot of the mountain is the Veronica Well (Veronikabrunnen or Verunčina studánka).
Immediately north of the mountain is the source region of the River Mandau.

Mountains and hills of Bohemian Switzerland
Towers in the Czech Republic
Děčín District